Ryazan-class steamship (formerly Iosif Stalin class) is a class of Russian river passenger ships. It is named after the city of Ryazan.

Ryazan were two-deck paddle steamers of Soviet Union and Hungarian construction manufactured in 1951–1959.

References

Ships of Russia
Ships of the Soviet Union
Hungary–Soviet Union relations